Li Ao, may refer to:

 Li Ao (philosopher) (772–841), Chinese philosopher and prose writer of the Tang dynasty.

 Li Ao (1935–2018), Chinese writer, social commentator, historian and independent politician based in Taiwan.

 Li Ao (academician) (1917–1999), Chinese engineer specializing in burn and trauma, and an academician of the Chinese Academy of Engineering.